S R Damani or Sujan Ratan Fatehchand Damani (14 July 1912, in Bikaner Rajasthan – 13 January 1995) was a member of the  2nd Lok Sabha of India from  the Jalore constituency of Rajasthan and a member of the Indian National Congress (INC) political party.  He later become member of 4th, 5th and 6th Lok Sabha from the Solapur constituency of Maharashtra

He was Chairman of Simplex Mills Company     Bombay,  Jamsri Ranjit Singhji Spinning and Weaving Mills Limited, Solapur and  Nav Bharat Refrigeration and    Industries Limited, New Delhi. He was married to Mrs Ratanbai and had 1 son and 3 daughters and resides at Damani House, Cuffe Parade Mumbai.

He founded a charitable Trust for the educational institutions, free maternity and child-welfare centres, for awarding scholarships for higher studies and other philanthropic purposes. He worked as  member of Executive Committee of  Congress Party in Parliament and its treasurer during  1969–1971.

References

External links
 Official biographical sketch in Parliament of India website

1912 births
India MPs 1967–1970
India MPs 1957–1962
People from Bikaner
India MPs 1971–1977
India MPs 1977–1979
People from Solapur
1995 deaths
Lok Sabha members from Maharashtra
Lok Sabha members from Rajasthan
Indian National Congress politicians from Maharashtra